Saint Hakob of Akori Monastery (pronounced Akori Surb Hakob Vank; also sometimes referred to as Saint James), was an Armenian monastery located in the southeastern part of the historic region of Surmali (today the Iğdır Province of modern Turkey).  The monastery was located 4.7 kilometers southwest of Akori, a village at the northeastern slope of Mount Ararat.  Destroyed by an earthquake and avalanche in 1840, Akori was later rebuilt.  It is known today as Yenidoğan and remains a small Kurdish village.

In 1829, Baltic German explorer Friedrich Parrot, Armenian writer Khachatur Abovian, and four others reached the top of Mount Ararat in the first recorded ascent in history.  They used St. Hakob as their base.

Architecture 
The monastery of St. Hakob was a cruciform central-plan structure constructed of black stone with a central dome typical for Armenian churches of the time.  The monastery had eucharistical inscriptions engraved upon the walls that dated from the 13th to 14th centuries.

History 
The monastery was founded in 341 A.D. by Jacob of Nisibis, the second bishop of Nisibis who lived during the 3rd to 4th centuries A.D. It was built upon the northeastern slope of Mount Ararat (the greater mountain is referred to as Masis in Armenian) in Masyatsotn canton of a larger province of  Ayrarat in Armenian kingdom.  Some sources say that St. Hakob was the name of the monastery while there was a chapel of St. James nearby, while other sources refer to the two as the same site.  The monastery is said to have contained relics of wood from the Biblical Ark of Noah.  A strong earthquake occurred at Mount Ararat on July 2, 1840 causing an avalanche that destroyed the monastery of St. Hakob, Arakelots Vank in the neighboring village of Akori as well as the village itself.

Folklore 
According to legend, St. Jacob tried many times to climb Mount Ararat to find Noah's Ark which was buried under thick layers of ice at Parrot Glacier upon the top of the mountain.  He would climb the mountain, fall asleep and wake up downhill from where he was. After repeated failed attempts, one day God said him in a dream "Do not try to find the Ark anymore. I will give you a piece of a wood of what the Ark was hewn". When he woke up, to his amazement he found the wood lying nearby.  He decided to build the monastery at the location that he found the wood.

References

340s establishments
Buildings and structures demolished in 1840
Christian monasteries established in the 4th century
Christian monasteries disestablished in the 19th century
Armenian Apostolic monasteries in Turkey
Destroyed churches in Turkey
Mount Ararat